Shenzhen Wasam Technology Co. Ltd also known as Wasam is a Chinese national hi-tech manufacturer of mobile phones, tablets and consumer electronics. Founded in 2005 in Shenzhen, Wasam currently counts more than 5,000 employees and produces two mobile phone brands of its own – international Telego sold in more than 60 countries, and domestic line Best Sonny. The company have successfully collaborated with international brands such as Samsung, AT&T, and China Mobile.

Manufacturing companies based in Shenzhen
Mobile phone manufacturers
Chinese brands